Liverpool, West Derby is a constituency represented in the House of Commons of the UK Parliament since 2019 by Ian Byrne of the Labour Party.

Boundaries

1885–1918: The Municipal Borough of Liverpool ward of West Derby.

1918–1950: The County Borough of Liverpool wards of Anfield, Breckfield, and West Derby.

1950–1955: The County Borough of Liverpool wards of Croxteth and West Derby.

1955–1983: The County Borough of Liverpool wards of Clubmoor, Croxteth, Dovecot, and Gillmoss.

1983–1997: The City of Liverpool wards of Clubmoor, Croxteth, Dovecot, Gillmoss, and Pirrie.

1997–2010: The City of Liverpool wards of Clubmoor, Croxteth, Dovecot, Gillmoss, Pirrie, and Tuebrook.

2010–present: The City of Liverpool wards of Croxteth, Knotty Ash, Norris Green, Tuebrook and Stoneycroft, West Derby, and Yew Tree.

The constituency is one of five covering the city of Liverpool and covers the northeast of the city, including Croxteth, Gillmoss, Knotty Ash, Norris Green, Tuebrook, and Stoneycroft as well as West Derby itself.

Following their review of parliamentary representation in Merseyside, the Boundary Commission created a modified West Derby constituency, which was fought at the 2010 general election. The commission's initial proposal to create a cross-border "Croxteth and Kirkby" constituency (which would have contained electoral wards from Knowsley borough, as well as from Liverpool) was dropped on its public consultation.

History
The seat was created in the Redistribution of Seats Act 1885 and can be considered a safe seat from 1964 to the present day for the Labour Party, having retained the seat at every general election since then. However, in the early-1980s, it was briefly held by the SDP as a result of sitting Labour MP Eric Ogden being among many defectors. Labour regained the seat at the 1983 general election, where Bob Wareing won the seat back for Labour.

Before 1964, it was held by the Conservative Party, although their share of the vote has declined considerably; so much so that at four recent general elections, they have finished in fourth place; however they managed to place in third at the 2015 general election and second place in 2017 and 2019.

At the general elections of 1997 and 2001, the Liverpool West Derby seat was the only constituency in England in which a minor party finished in second place, the Liberal Party who had all three local councillors for one electoral ward in the area. At the 2005 general election, however, the Liberals were pushed into third place by the Liberal Democrats and fell to fourth place in 2015, with UKIP finishing in second place.

Sir F E Smith
Sir Frederick Edwin Smith, then Solicitor-General in the David Lloyd George Coalition Government, was returned for Liverpool West Derby at the 1918 general election; when constituency reorganisation abolished his former neighbouring Walton seat. He sat for only two months, being promoted Lord High Chancellor of Great Britain and raised to the peerage as Lord Birkenhead in February 1919. He was the first of two MPs for this seat to achieve the highest legal office.

David Maxwell Fyfe
Maxwell Fyfe, KC, MP from 1935 to 1954 (including World War II) became the highest judge in the country, the Lord Chancellor, having been the Attorney General and Solicitor General for England and Wales. He helped to co-write the European Convention on Human Rights and was one of the key prosecutors at the Nuremberg Trials jointly with the (Labour-member) prosecutor Sir Hartley Shawcross. At this task was a "capable lawyer, efficient administrator and concerned housemaster". There were misgivings in some quarters as to how Fyfe would perform, cross-examination not being regarded as one of his strengths. However his cross-examination of Hermann Göring is one of the most noted cross-examinations in history. "Faced with sustained and methodical competence rather than brilliance, Goering... crumbled".
Stephen Twigg
Stephen Twigg ousted Michael Portillo in the normally right-leaning Enfield  Southgate seat and represented it from 1997 until the 2005 general election; briefly serving as schools minister before that year's general election, which he lost, before five years later, standing for this normally left-leaning seat in Liverpool.

Members of Parliament

Elections

Elections in the 2010s

Paul Parr was also the Liberal Democrat candidate at both the 2010 and 2015 general elections, when he was known as Paul Twigger. Graham Hughes ran on an anti-Brexit platform as an independent in 2017, and subsequently joined the Liberal Democrats.

Elections in the 2000s

Elections in the 1990s

Elections in the 1980s

Elections in the 1970s

Elections in the 1960s

Elections in the 1950s

Elections in the 1940s

Elections in the 1930s

Elections in the 1920s

Elections in the 1910s

Elections in the 1900s

Elections in the 1890s 

 Caused by Cross' death.

Elections in the 1880s 

 Caused by Hamilton's resignation.

See also
 List of parliamentary constituencies in Merseyside

Notes

References

Parliamentary constituencies in North West England
West Derby
Constituencies of the Parliament of the United Kingdom established in 1885